Martin Herbster (born 29 January 1962) is a German wrestler. He competed in the men's freestyle 62 kg at the 1984 Summer Olympics.

References

1962 births
Living people
German male sport wrestlers
Olympic wrestlers of West Germany
Wrestlers at the 1984 Summer Olympics
Sportspeople from Karlsruhe